The 1924 WAFL season was the 40th season of the West Australian Football League. Although East Perth and East Fremantle completely dominated the season until after the Carnival, each having lost only one match of the first eleven, neither was to win the premiership and the Royals’ record sequence of five consecutive premierships came to an end in the semi-final.

Subiaco, who along with Perth had been in the doldrums during previous seasons, finally developed the teamwork to match the individual talents of players like Outridge, skipper “Snowy” Hamilton and young rover Johnny Leonard – consequently carrying all before them during the finals after a mediocre home-and-away season. Despite maintaining prominence for another decade, the Maroons were to become a perennial cellar-dweller for three decades and failed to win another premiership until 1973 – the longest premiership drought in WA(N)FL history. Despite Gosnell being the second of their famous half-back line to win the Sandover Medal, West Perth fell to wooden spooners owing to the suspension of key forward Fred Wimbridge for most of the season.

Following controversy over his clearance from South Fremantle that caused him to sit out the 1923 season, East Perth's “Bonny” Campbell was to break Allan Evans’ record from 1921 for the most goals scored during a WAFL season with 67.

Including the Hobart Carnival, where he kicked 51 goals - including an amazing 23 goals against Queensland - Campbell kicked 118 goals for the entire year, with his 100-goal season coming five years before Gordon Coventry and six years before Ken Farmer.

Home-and-away season

Round 1

Round 2

Round 3

Round 4

Round 5 (Foundation Day)

Round 6

Round 7

Round 8

Round 9

Round 10

Round 11

Round 12

Round 13

Round 14

Round 15

Ladder

Final

First semi-final

Second semi-final

Final

Grand Final

References

External links
Official WAFL website
West Australian Football League (WAFL), 1924

West Australian Football League seasons
WAFL